Blue Mountain Faulkner 1 Geothermal Power Plant is a geothermal power plant located in Humboldt County, Nevada, United States. It is owned and operated by Nevada Geothermal Power Inc.  Produced electricity is sold to NV Energy through a  120-kV transmission line to the transmission grid connection at Mill City, Nevada.

The plant was completed in October 2009. It is a binary cycle geothermal plant, which uses a closed-loop heat exchange system. In this system hot geothermal water with an average temperature of  heats a secondary fluid, isobutane, which is vaporized and used to run a turbine. The geothermal water is supplied by five production wells and injected by six injection wells. There is program to add three new production wells.

The technology was supplied by Ormat Technologies.  The well drilling contractors were ThermaSource and Ensign.  The piping contractor was JFMPE and the reservoir engineering was handled by GeoThermEx Inc.  The plant cost US$180 million, of which $57.9 million was funded under the American Reinvestment and Recovery Act.

References

Geothermal power stations in Nevada
Buildings and structures in Humboldt County, Nevada
Energy infrastructure completed in 2009